24Kitchen is a Dutch television specialty channel that airs both one-time and recurring (episodic) programs about food and cooking, owned by The Walt Disney Company (Benelux) BV.

History
The channel was launched by Fox Networks Group Benelux in cooperation with Jan Dekker Holding, which airs across the Netherlands. It's also available in HD. It launched on 1 October 2011. A preview channel was shown on the UPC Netherlands platform a month before the launch.

24Kitchen Portugal is modeled out of the Dutch version, with original content and international series. It was launched by Fox Networks Group Portugal in 2012 in Portugal and Africa. Later followed by localised versions across Southeast Europe.

On 20 March 2019 The Walt Disney Company acquired 21st Century Fox, including Fox Networks Group Benelux.

On December 13, 2020, a select number of 24Kitchen programs were made available to stream on Disney+ in the Netherlands.

Programming 
 Amazing Weddingcakes
 Avec Eric
 Bak met Miljuschka
 Bill's Food
 De Makkelijke Maaltijd
 Fast, Fresh, Simple
 
 Jamie’s Family Christmas 
 Lako, može svako 
 Meat vs. Veg
 No Reservations
 Rudolph's Bakery
 The Free Range Cook
 The Taste of Cooking
 The Taste of Life Basics
 The Taste of Life Travel
 Verstip
 Jamie Oliver's Food Revolution

See also
Fox Networks Group Benelux

References

External links 

 

Television channels in the Netherlands
Television channels in North Macedonia
Television channels and stations established in 2011
Fox Networks Group
Disney television networks